The first season of the American drama thriller series Quantico premiered in the United States on the American Broadcasting Company (ABC) on September 27, 2015, and concluded on May 15, 2016. ABC Studios produced the season, with creator Joshua Safran, Mark Gordon, Robert Sertner, Nicholas Pepper and Jake Coburn serving as executive producers.

Consisting of twenty-two episodes, season one follows Alex Parrish, the brightest FBI recruit in her class, who becomes an FBI field agent after graduating from the FBI Academy at Quantico, Virginia, and later becomes a prime suspect after a terrorist attack on Grand Central Terminal. Told using dual timelines, the narrative switches between the present, where Parrish runs from captivity to prove her innocence, and the past, which shows her training at the academy with her fellow recruits as details about their lives and relationships with one another are revealed.

Season one aired on Sundays in the United States at 10:00 p.m. It debuted with strong numbers, averaging 8.05 million viewers and received positive reviews from critics. Priyanka Chopra won the 2016's People's Choice Award for Favorite Actress in a New TV Series for her portrayal of Alex Parrish, making her the first South Asian to win a People's Choice Award. Walt Disney Studios Home Entertainment released season one on DVD on September 13, 2016.

Overview
Season one begins with Alex Parrish, a former FBI recruit, becoming a prime suspect following a terrorist attack on Grand Central Terminal. She is taken into custody and charged with treason. Her first escape is orchestrated by Deputy Director Miranda Shaw, her primary instructor at Quantico, who refuses to believe that she is guilty and feels someone from her class has framed her. Various flashbacks show Parrish and fellow agents, each having their secret reasons for joining the FBI, training at the FBI Academy. The present timeline focuses on the restrained relationship between Parrish and her boyfriend Ryan Booth and fellow trainees and friends, including: Shelby Wyatt, Nimah and Raina Amin, Natalie Vasquez, Simon Asher, Elias Harper and Caleb Haas, who all somehow seem connected to the bombing, while she is on the run to prove her innocence.

As the season progresses, Alex is able to prove her innocence with the help of her friends. She discovers that the suspected bomber is former FBI analyst-trainee Elias Harper, who planted the bomb on the instructions of a terrorist mastermind. Having cleared her name at a congressional hearing, Parrish is reinstated as an FBI agent and assigned to the field office in New York. In the operations section, she works to uncover the mastermind behind the bombings, as the 2016 presidential election nears. The supervising training agent Liam O'Connor is eventually revealed to be the responsible individual and is shot and killed by Parrish and Booth. Parrish is fired from the FBI because of the subsequent publicity of the bombings and Liam's treachery. Two months later, she is approached by Matthew Keyes, who offers her a position at the Central Intelligence Agency (CIA).

Episodes

Cast

Main
 Priyanka Chopra as Alex Parrish
 Josh Hopkins as Liam O'Connor
 Jake McLaughlin as Ryan Booth
 Aunjanue Ellis as Miranda Shaw
 Yasmine Al Massri as Nimah and Raina Amin
 Johanna Braddy as Shelby Wyatt
 Tate Ellington as Simon Asher
 Graham Rogers as Caleb Haas
 Anabelle Acosta as Natalie Vasquez

Recurring
 Anna Khaja as Sita Parrish
 Eliza Coupe as Hannah Wyland
 Mark Pellegrino as Clayton Haas
 Marcia Cross as Senator Claire Haas
 Lenny Platt as Drew Perales
 Li Jun Li as Iris Chang
 Jay Armstrong Johnson as Will Olsen
 Rick Cosnett as Elias Harper
 J. Mallory McCree as Charlie Price
 Kelly Rutherford as Laura Wyatt
 Kevin Kilner as Glenn Wyatt
 Jacob Artist as Brandon Fletcher

Guest
 Peter Michael Dillon as Fred Baxter
 Anthony Ruivivar as Agent Jimenez
 Brian J. Smith as Eric Packer
 Johnathon Schaech as Michael Parrish
 Oded Fehr as Griffin Wells
 Ariane Rinehart as Louisa O'Connor
 Anna Diop as Mia
 David Alpay as Duncan Howell
 Anne Heche as Dr. Susan Langdon
 Michael Aronov as Hamza Kouri
 Mandy Gonzalez as Susan Coombs
 Henry Czerny as Matthew Keyes
 Mark Ghanimé as Danny

Production

Development
Joshua Safran pitched the series to ABC, describing the show as "Grey's Anatomy meets Homeland". On September 17, 2014, ABC announced the network had bought the original concept for the drama series from ABC Studios, and creator Safran and producer Mark Gordon. ABC ordered the pilot on January 23, 2015, for the 2015–16 television season. In May 2015, the show was ordered to series, with an initial order of 13 episodes for the 2015 network-television season. Good ratings led ABC to pick up the show for a full season on October 13, 2015, with an additional six episodes, increasing the episode count to 19, with the possibility of more episodes. The next month, the season was extended to 22 episodes.

The first season was produced by the ABC Studios in association with The Mark Gordon Company and Random Acts Productions. Safran, Gordon, Robert Sertner, Nicholas Pepper and Jake Coburn served as the executive producers. The show was designed to have a flashback narrative, shifting between two timelines. Safran incorporated the flashforward storytelling technique as he thought it allowed them to spread out the plot points.

Casting

The casting began in February 2015, with Priyanka Chopra landing the role of protagonist Alex Parrish. Tate Ellington was the first actor to be cast to play one of the FBI trainees – Simon Asher. After his casting, Graham Rogers was cast as FBI trainee Caleb Hass. Aunjanue Ellis was signed to play Miranda Shaw, the assistant director of the Academy, and overseer of the new recruits' training; Dougray Scott was cast as Miranda's former partner and subordinate. In early March, Jake McLaughlin was chosen to play Alex's love interest Ryan Booth, while Johanna Braddy and Yasmine Al Massri rounded out the cast in the final co-starring roles as trainees Shelby Wyatt and the twins Nimah and Raina Amin, respectively. With the series order in May, ABC announced that Dougray Scott, who played Liam O'Connor, would be re-cast in the show. In July 2015, Josh Hopkins joined the cast in the role of Liam O'Connor. The same month, Anabelle Acosta and Rick Cosnett were cast in recurring roles as Natalie Vasquez and Elias Harper. Later, Acosta was promoted to series regular. In September 2015, Jacob Artist was cast in the recurring role of an FBI agent-in-training. In November 2015, Marcia Cross joined the cast as Caleb's mother Claire Haas. Jay Armstrong Johnson, Lenny Platt and Li Jun Li were cast for three recurring characters in November 2015.

Initially conceived as an ensemble drama, Chopra's casting played a key role in the design of the show. Apart from becoming the show's face, and featuring heavily in its publicity campaign, it was specially re-written to center around her as the main character.

Filming
The pilot episode was filmed extensively in Atlanta in March 2015, with two more days of filming in New York City. The later episodes were filmed in Montreal, Quebec, using settings within downtown Montreal and Sherbrooke, Quebec to stand in for New York City and Quantico. Production began in late July 2015 and ended in mid-April, 2016. Scenes of the Quantico Academy were shot at the campus of the Université de Sherbrooke, which stood in for the FBI Academy in Quantico, Virginia, where the show is based. The series was shot both in studio at Mel’s Cité du Cinéma and on location. Colleen Sharp, Nicholas Erasmus, Terilyn A. Shropshire and Lori Ball were the editors for multiple episodes. Allyson C Johnson and Vanessa Procopio edited one episode each. The Director of Photography was Anthony Wolberg, who has provided cinematography for the maximum episodes. Other cinematographers include Anastas N. Michos and Todd McMullen. Joel J. Richard provided the music.

Reception

Critical response
The first season of Quantico received positive reviews, with most praising Priyanka Chopra's performance. The review aggregator website Rotten Tomatoes reported an 82% approval rating with an average rating of 6.9/10 based on 56 reviews. The website's critical consensus reads, "Obvious copycatting aside, Quantico provides ludicrously entertaining thrills from a well-balanced cast." Metacritic, which uses a weighted average, assigned a score of 70 out of 100 based on 25 critics, indicating "generally favorable reviews". 

Newark Star-Ledgers Vicki Hyman declared it to be the best new show of the season, giving it an "A". She felt the show was "taut and terrifically calibrated" noting it has "at least one deadly effective twist you won't see coming". The San Francisco Chronicle praised the series, calling it a winner and wrote: "The plot is intricate and compelling, the characters magnetic and mysterious at the same time." James Poniewozik of The New York Times wrote about Chopra's performance, describing her as the "strongest human asset" of the show, and added that "she is immediately charismatic and commanding". He added that "the narrative gymnastics make the first half-hour of Quantico pass quickly and entertainingly. Too much of this, though, keeps you from investing much in the characters." Robert Bianco from USA Today gave it a three out of four, praising the diversity of the cast and Chopra's and Ellis performances, writing "There are times when Quantico feels a shade mechanical, in moments when you can practically hear the plot gears moving. But it accomplishes what the opener of a whodunit needs to do: establish a wide range of plausible suspects and spark our interest in the mystery and the hero." In contrast, TheWraps Tim Grierson, who although felt that the show "provides sexy fun", was less impressed, writing that the show often succumbed to "lame-brained plotting" and an unconvincing portrayal of the setting. He concluded saying that the fluffy material did not fit well with the darker tones "meant to be struck by the introduction of a cataclysmic terrorist attack."

Accolades
Season one was nominated for two People's Choice Awards at the 2016 ceremony: Favorite New TV Drama and Favorite Actress in a New TV Series which Chopra won making her the first South Asian to win a People's Choice Award. The first season was also nominated for two Teen Choice Awards: Choice Breakout Series and Choice TV: Breakout Star for Chopra. People and Vanity Fair listed the first season among the Best Television Shows of 2015.

Ratings
The season one premiere on September 27, 2015, attracted 7.14 million viewers with a 1.9 rating among adults 18–49 to rank as the highest-rated scripted telecast on Sunday night opposite Sunday Night Football. It also built by 36% on its lead-in Blood & Oil, which had a 1.4 rating. The pilot episode was also a huge gainer for DVR playback, with over 5 million, a 79% rise for a total 3.4 rating among adults 18–49 and a viewer total of 12.15 million. The show continued to perform well during live viewing while registering strong gains in DVR playback, more than doubling several times in season one. The finale episode garnered 3.78 million viewers with a 1.0 rating among adults in the 18–49 demographic, with a DVR boost of 120% for a total 2.2 rating among adults 18–49 and a total of 6.70 million viewers. Overall, the first season averaged 8.05 million viewers with a 2.6 rating among adults in the 18–49 demographic. It was the third best new series of the season among the adults 18–49 demographic.

Home media release
The first season of Quantico was released on DVD and Blu-ray on September 13, 2016 in Region 1.

References

General references

External links 
 
 
 

Quantico (TV series)
2015 American television seasons
2016 American television seasons